The 1952 Yugoslav Cup was the 6th season of the top football knockout competition in SFR Yugoslavia, the Yugoslav Cup, also known as the "Marshal Tito Cup" (Kup Maršala Tita), since its establishment in 1946.

Round of 32

Round of 16

Quarterfinals

Semifinals

Finals
November 29, 1952 - Belgrade, Serbia

Partizan 6 - 0 Crvena Zvezda Beograd

Stadium: Centralnog doma Jugoslovenske Armije (JNA Stadium)

Attendance: 50,000

Referee: Vasa Stefanovič (Beograd)

Crvena Zvezda: Srboljub Krivokuća, Branko Stanković, Miljan Zeković, Siniša Zlatković, Milorad Diskić, Predrag Đajić, Kosta Tomašević, Rajko Mitić, Tihomir Ognjanov, Todor Živanović, Branislav Vukosavljević

Partizan: Slavko Stojanović, Bruno Belin, Ratko Čolić, Zlatko Čajkovski, Vojo Stefanović, Miodrag Jovanović, Marko Valok, Todor Veselinović, Stjepan Bobek, Aleksandar Atanacković, Branko Zebec

See also
1952 Yugoslav First League
1952 Yugoslav Second League

Source(s)
1952 Yugoslav Cup details at Rec.Sport.Soccer Statistics Foundation

1952
Cup